Kenneth Richard Purpur (March 1, 1932 – June 5, 2011) was an ice hockey player who played for the American national team. He won a silver medal at the 1956 Winter Olympics. He is the younger brother of Fido Purpur who coached him at the University of North Dakota.

References

1932 births
2011 deaths
Ice hockey players at the 1956 Winter Olympics
Medalists at the 1956 Winter Olympics
Sportspeople from Grand Forks, North Dakota
Olympic silver medalists for the United States in ice hockey
American men's ice hockey right wingers
Ice hockey people from North Dakota
North Dakota Fighting Hawks men's ice hockey players